Beculeşti may refer to several villages in Romania:

 Beculeşti, a village in Ciomăgești Commune, Argeș County
 Beculeşti, a village in Cârlogani Commune, Olt County